K67 or K-67 may refer to:

K-67 (Kansas highway), a state highway in Kansas
K67 kiosk
HMS Snowdrop (K67), a UK Royal Navy ship